Robert Andrew Kirsch (born 1966) is an American state court judge from New Jersey who is a nominee to serve as a United States district judge of the United States District Court for the District of New Jersey.

Education 
Born in Livingston, New Jersey, Kirsch grew up in South Orange, New Jersey and attended Columbia High School. He received a Bachelor of Arts from Emory University in 1988 and a Juris Doctor from the Fordham University School of Law in 1991.

Career 

From 1991 to 1993, he served as a law clerk for Judge William Zloch of the United States District Court for the Southern District of Florida. From 1993 to 1997, he was a trial attorney in the Civil Division of the U.S. Department of Justice in Washington, D.C. From 1997 to 2010, he served as an assistant United States attorney in the U.S. Attorney's Office for the District of New Jersey.  During his time there, Kirsch focused on prosecuting white collar crime. Since 2010, he has served as a judge of the New Jersey Superior Court for Union County.

Nomination to district court  

Kirsch was recommended for the court seat by U.S. Senator Robert Menendez. On December 21, 2022, President Joe Biden announced his intent to nominate Kirsch to serve as a United States District Judge of the United States District Court for the District of New Jersey. On January 3, 2023, his nomination was sent to the Senate. President Biden nominated Kirsch to the seat vacated by Judge Freda L. Wolfson, who retired on February 1, 2023. On January 25, 2023, a hearing on his nomination was held before the Senate Judiciary Committee. His nomination is pending before the Senate Judiciary Committee.

References 

1966 births
Living people
20th-century American lawyers
21st-century American judges
21st-century American lawyers
Assistant United States Attorneys
Columbia High School (New Jersey) alumni
Emory University alumni
Fordham University School of Law alumni
New Jersey Republicans
New Jersey state court judges
People from Livingston, New Jersey
People from South Orange, New Jersey
People from Westfield, New Jersey
Superior court judges in the United States
United States Department of Justice lawyers